Laibach is a Slovenian industrial musical group.

Laibach may refer to:

 Ljubljana, the capital of Slovenia, by historical German name
 Laibach (album), eponymous album of Slovenian industrial musical group
 Laibach (Ruthebach), a river of North Rhine-Westphalia, Germany, headstream of the Ruthebach
 Laibach, a historical neighborhood of Sheboygan, Wisconsin
 Laibach, a label of wine produced by the Laibach Vineyards in Stellenbosch, South Africa
 Friedrich Laibach, German botanist